Gubernija is a brewery in Lithuania. It is one of the oldest businesses in the world, having been founded in 1665. Gubernija is listed on the NASDAQ OMX Vilnius stock exchange. Unlike other Lithuanian breweries, Gubernija has its own pubs.

Gubernija was privatised in 1999, and in 2006, it was taken over by Tomkus. The chairman is Romualdas Dunauskas.

Beers
 Ekstra, Pale lager,
 Grand, Malt liquor
 Ledas 
 Ledukas, Low alcohol beer
 Kunigaikščių, Dunkler bock
 Žigulinis, Lager
 Dvaro Mišas

External links
Gubernija

References

Beer in Lithuania
Companies listed on Nasdaq Vilnius
Companies established in 1665
1665 establishments in the Polish–Lithuanian Commonwealth
Companies based in Šiauliai
17th-century establishments in Lithuania